Israr Ahmad (19 December 1940 – 2 April 2010) was an Indian theoretical nuclear physicist and professor at Aligarh Muslim University since 1961. He was known for his work in quantum scattering theory.

He was an associate member of the International Center for Theoretical Physics located in Trieste (Italy), a member of the New York Academy of Sciences, and the Indian Physics Association. He was Founding Director of the Center for Promotion of Science at the Aligarh Muslim University from its inception in 1985 to 1991, and Chairman of its Department of Physics  from 1988 to 1991. He was editor of the monthly Urdu journal Tahzibul Akhlaq of Aligarh Muslim University from June 1986 to 1990. In addition, he had served as professor at King Abdul Aziz University in Saudi Arabia. He was married to Mahe Laka (daughter of Dr. Qammrudeen).

Personal life and education
Israr was born in village Mahuwara of District Azamgarh in a Zamindara family. He graduated from Shibli National Degree College, Azamgarh in 1959 receiving his Intermediate and B.Sc. degree. He was awarded Gold Medal by the Gorakhpur University in 1959 for standing first in his B.Sc. examination. He received his M.Sc. degree in Physics at AMU, in 1961 and was awarded the F.D. Murad Medal for standing first. He started his Ph.D. in the department of Physics, AMU, under supervision of Prof. Mohd. Zillur Rahman Khan but submitted it as a Teacher candidate in 1969.

Centre for Promotion of Science (CPS)
Apart from his scientific work, Ahmad was keen in spreading the message of Islamic reformer Sir Syed Ahmad Khan. He was one of the strong supporters of the Aligarh Movement and revived the mission of Sir Syed to promote modern education, especially science, among oriental students and seminaries. To achieve this, with the support of Dr. Abdus Salam, he established the Centre for Promotion of Science (CPS) at AMU Aligarh in 1985, and was appointed as Founder Director of the center.

The center played a key role as a bridge between the Madrasah and a modern institution. It organized several refresher courses, seminars, series of lectures for Madrasah students and seminaries. In these, Ahmad organized a number of conferences on 'Religious Seminaries and Science Education', and conducted several introductory science courses for the teachers of Muslim religious seminaries. He established an independent office of CPS next to the Department of Physics and Dean Faculty of Science. He served CPS until 1991 and handed over his post to his student Professor. Abdul Qaiyum.

Tahzibul Akhlaq 
In 1864 Sir Syed Ahmed Khan started the Urdu journal Tahzibul Akhlaq to spread awareness of contemporary socio-economic and educational developments in the Muslim community. Tahzibul Akhlaq was discontinued in 1881, but 100 years later, his ardent supporter, the then Vice-Chancellor Syed Hamid, revived it in 1981.  Ahmad took an interest in the project and its promotion and was appointed its editor in June 1986, taking over this position from Prof. Noorul Hasan Naqvi. He played a key role in making Tahzibul Akhlaq a viable journal. As a science fiction writer in Hindi, Urdu, and English, Ahmad wrote several articles in different journals. He served as the editor of Tahzibul Akhlaq until 1990, when he handed over the post to Prof. Kabir Ahmad Jaisi.

Death 
Ahmad died on 2 April 2010 at Holy Family Hospital in New Delhi. His body was brought to Aligarh and was buried at the Aligarh Muslim University graveyard.  He left behind his wife, sons Shahid Israr and Khalid Israr, and daughters Sabiha Alvi and Sobia Wahid.

See also 
 List of physicists
 List of theoretical physicists
 String Theory
 Theory of everything
 Unified Field Theory

References 

Academic staff of Aligarh Muslim University
20th-century Indian physicists
Scientists from Uttar Pradesh
20th-century Indian Muslims
2010 deaths
1940 births
People from Azamgarh district
Indian theoretical physicists